Hollywood & Wine is a 2010 American comedy film directed by Kevin P. Farley.

Plot
Diane Blaine has the face of a movie star. Unfortunately, fallen star/tabloid queen Jamie Stephens already made it famous. Hollywood's constant rejections of Diane due to what she refers to as "TJS" ("Too Jamie Stephens") have made her bitter, frustrated, and whiny. Her co-worker/boyfriend Jack Sanders doesn't help matters. His idea of ambition is letting it ride. Now he's in major debt to a trigger-happy mobster who has a thing for Jamie Stephens. Jack's only way out is to convince Diane to be Jamie and wipe out the debt having one meal with a made man. It's literally the performance of her life. With Jack's on the line.

Cast
 Nicky Whelan as Diane Blaine / Jamie Stephens
 Chris Kattan as Jack Sanders
 Pamela Anderson as Herself
 David Spade as Harvey Harrison
 Chazz Palminteri as Geno Scarpaci
 Norm Macdonald as Sid Blaustein
 Jeremy London as Jean-Luc Marceau
 Kevin Farley as Bruno
 John P. Farley as Joey
 Vivica A. Fox as Jackie Johnson
 Horatio Sanz as Tony
 Chris Parnell as Peter West
 Leslie Easterbrook as Hattie
 Miguel A. Nunez Jr. as "Hawk" Miller

References

External links
 

2010 films
American comedy films
Films about entertainers
Films set in Los Angeles
2010 comedy films
Films about Hollywood, Los Angeles
2010s English-language films
2010s American films